The 2020 Baton Rouge mayoral election was held on November 3, 2020 and December 5, 2020 to elect the mayor-president of Baton Rouge, Louisiana.

As no candidate won a majority in the first round, a runoff was held between the top two candidates, incumbent Mayor-President Sharon Weston Broome of the Democratic Party and fmr. State Representative Steve Carter of the Republican Party. Despite initially tight polls in the runoff, which showed Carter within reach of winning the election, Broome won by a decisive margin.

Held in the midst of the COVID-19 pandemic, campaigning was limited to smaller private events, limiting both candidates' exposure and public attention on the race. Major issues of the race were: crime, economic development, pandemic recovery, infrastructure, and education. Due to consistently lack-luster public support of incumbent Mayor-President Broome, the race drew seven total candidates, the most a mayoral incumbent in East Baton Rouge Parish had faced in nearly 30 years.

Following the race's conclusion, runner-up Steve Carter contracted COVID-19, dying two months later from COVID-19 related complications on January 26, 2021. Carter's death was followed by an outpouring of fond emotion, including from his electoral opponent Broome, who stated, "You never saw him without a smile on his face and a hand extended to greet you, Steve was a Baton Rougean through and through. I am tremendously sad to have lost yet another friend and neighbor to COVID-19. Our thoughts and prayers are with Steve's family and his many friends as we mourn his great loss."

Declared 

 Sharon Weston Broome, incumbent Mayor-President (Party preference: Democratic)
 Matthew Watson, East Baton Rouge Metro Councilman (Party preference: Republican)
 Steve Carter, former State Representative (Party preference: Republican)
 C. Denise Marcelle, State Representative (Party preference: Democratic)
 Jordan Piazza, owner of Uncle Earl's Bar (Party preference: Republican)
 E. Eric Guirard, attorney (Party preference: Independent)
 Frank Smith III, property manager (Party preference: Republican)

Disqualified 
Tara Wicker, Baton Rouge Metro Councilwoman (Party preference: Democratic)

Polling

Results 

The election resulted in a runoff between Broome and former Republican state representative Steve Carter, after no candidate received more than 50% of the vote.

Runoff results
Incumbent Mayor Sharon Weston Broome would win the December 5 runoff after securing a decisive 57% of the vote. Broome's opponent, former State Representative Steve Carter received 43%. Broome's victory was the first time any female had been re-elected to the position. Carter called Broome just after 9:30 p.m. December 5, 2020 to congratulate her on her victory. Baton Rouge has historically voted democrat in its local elections. Only two republicans have held the office over the last 100 years.

See also
 2020 Louisiana elections

Notes

References

External links
Official campaign websites for mayoral candidates
 Jordan Piazza (I) for Mayor-President 
 Matthew Watson (R) for Mayor-President 

Baton Rouge
Mayoral elections in Baton Rouge, Louisiana
Baton Rouge